Radu Albot and Jaroslav Pospíšil were the defending champions, but Pospíšil did not play. Albot partnered with Matteo Viola, but they lost to Riccardo Ghedin and Ramkumar Ramanathan in the first round.

Mate Pavić and Michael Venus won the title, defeating Ghedin and Ramanathan in the final, 5–7, 6–3, [10–4].

Seeds

Draw

References
 Main Draw

Mersin Cup - Doubles